Hong Hye-ji (born 25 August 1996) is a South Korean footballer who plays as a defender for Hyundai Steel Red Angels in the WK League and the South Korea national team.

Club career
On 24 December 2016, Hong signed a one-year contract with Nadeshiko League club INAC Kobe Leonessa, where she made only two appearances before returning to South Korea. On 27 December 2017, she was drafted first overall in the 2018 WK League Draft by Changnyeong. On 23 April 2018, she made her debut in a 1–0 away loss to Suwon UDC. On 9 July 2018, she scored her first goal in a 3–0 away win over Boeun Sangmu.

International career
Hong was part of the under-16 team that finished in fourth place at the 2011 AFC U-16 Women's Championship in China. She helped the under-19 team win the 2013 AFC U-19 Women's Championship and finish third at the 2015 AFC U-19 Women's Championship. She also represented South Korea at the 2014 FIFA U-20 Women's World Cup in Canada and at the 2016 FIFA U-20 Women's World Cup in Papua New Guinea.

On 29 November 2015, Hong made her senior debut in a 1–0 loss to Australia. On 4 June 2016, she scored her first goal in a 5–0 victory against Myanmar.

International goals
Scores and results list South Korea's goal tally first.

Career statistics

Club
.

International
.

Honours

International
 AFC U-19 Women's Championship: 2013

Individual
 KFA Young Player of the Year: 2015

References

External links
 
 Hong Hye-ji at Soccerway
 Hong Hye-ji at the Korea Women's Football Federation (KWFF)
 Hong Hye-ji at the Korea Football Association (KFA)

1996 births
Living people
South Korean women's footballers
South Korea women's international footballers
Women's association football defenders
Expatriate women's footballers in Japan
Footballers at the 2018 Asian Games
Asian Games bronze medalists for South Korea
Asian Games medalists in football
Medalists at the 2018 Asian Games
South Korea women's under-20 international footballers